Thecamoeba is a genus of Amoebozoa with a tough pellicle simulating a shell.

It includes the species:
 T. aesculea Kudryavtsev & Hausmann 2009
 T. assimilis Lepşi 1960
 ?T. bilizi (Schaeffer 1926)
 ?T. circita Dumas 1929
 ?T. corrugata Bovee 1953
 T. cosmophorea Mesentsev & Smirnov 2019
 ?T. exapartirta Escomel 1929
 T. hilla Schaeffer 1926
 T. hoffmani Sawyer, Hnath & Conrad 1974
 T. munda Schaeffer 1926
 T. orbis Schaeffer 1926
 ?T. ovalis Lepşi 1960
 ?T. papyracea (Penard 1905)
 T. pulchra (Biernacka 1963) Page 1977
 T. quadrilineata (Carter 1856) Lepşi 1960
 ?T. quinquepartita Dumas 1929
 ?T. rugosa Schaeffer 1926
 T. similis (Greeff 1891) Lepşi 1960
 T. sparolata (Fishbeck & Bovee 1993)
 T. sphaeronucleolus (Greeff 1891) Schaeffer 1926
 T. striata (Penard 1890) Schaeffer 1926
 T. terricola (Greeff 1866) Lepşi 1960
 T. verrucosa (Ehrenberg 1838) Schaeffer 1926

References

Amoebozoa genera
Discosea